Jiichirō, Jiichiro, Jiichiroh or Jiichirou (written: 治一郎) is a masculine Japanese given name. Notable people with the name include:

, Japanese sport wrestler
, Japanese politician and businessman
, Japanese photographer

Japanese masculine given names